Natalia Streignard (born September 9, 1970)  is a Spanish-born Venezuelan actress. Natalia is best known for her work in successful telenovelas such as El Juramento with Osvaldo Rios, La mujer de mi vida, with ex-spouse Mario Cimarro, Mi destino eres tu with Lucero and Jorge Salinas, and La Tormenta with Christian Meier, in the most famous telenovelas productions of Televisa, Venevision and Telemundo.

Personal life
On June 10, 1999, Streignard married Cuban actor Mario Cimarro, whom she met in 1998 on the set of "La mujer de mi vida".  In 2006, Streignard and Cimarro separated and then filed for divorce. It was finalized on 14 September 2006.

In 2008, she met Donato Calandriello, an Italian businessman. They married on 27 September 2008. They have three children.

Filmography

References

External links
 

RCTV personalities
Living people
Venezuelan telenovela actresses
1970 births